Asaran (also Romanized as Āsārān; also known as Anāsarān) is a village in Chashm Rural District, Shahmirzad District, Mehdishahr County, Semnan Province, Iran. At the 2006 census, its population was 34, in 9 families.

References 

Populated places in Mehdishahr County